This is a list of nature centers in the U.S. state of Illinois.

Nature centers

See also
 List of nature centers in the United States

References

 Environmental Education Association of Illinois

External links
 Map of nature centers and environmental education centers in Illinois

Nature centers

Illinois